The 2018 SAFF U-18 Women's Championship was the first edition of the SAFF U-18 Women's Championship, an international football competition for women's under-18 national teams organized by SAFF. The tournament was hosted from 28 September – 7 October 2018 at Changlimithang Stadium. Six teams from the region took part (Sri Lanka had its team withdrawn from the tournament).

Venue
All matches were played  at the Changlimithang Stadium in Thimphu, Bhutan.

Draw 
A draw for tournament ceremony was held on 7 July 2018 in Motijheel at conference room of Bangladesh Football Federation. SAFF general secretary Anwarul Haque Helal and BFF general secretary Abu Nayeem Shohag, were among others present on the occasion. Initially all of seven countries team participated for the draw, two groups A and B were made: group A consisted of India, Sri Lanka and Maldives and group B consisted of Nepal, Bangladesh, Bhutan and Pakistan. Later, however, Sri Lanka had their team withdrawn from the tournament and the groups were redefined.

 † Sri Lanka withdrew before tournament
 ‡ Bhutan drawn to Group A, thus both the groups redefined

Squads
Each team had to register a squad of minimum 18 players and maximum 23 players, minimum three of whom must be goalkeepers.

Players eligibility
Players born on or after 1 January 2000 were eligible to compete in the tournament. Each team had to register a squad of minimum 16 players and maximum 23 players, minimum two of whom must be goalkeepers.

Group stage

Tiebreakers
Teams are ranked according to points (3 points for a win, 1 point for a draw, 0 points for a loss), and if tied on points, the following tiebreaking criteria are applied, in the order given, to determine the rankings.
Points in head-to-head matches among tied teams;
Goal difference in head-to-head matches among tied teams;
Goals scored in head-to-head matches among tied teams;
If more than two teams are tied, and after applying all head-to-head criteria above, a subset of teams are still tied, all head-to-head criteria above are reapplied exclusively to this subset of teams;
Goal difference in all group matches;
Goals scored in all group matches;
Penalty shoot-out if only two teams are tied and they met in the last round of the group;
Disciplinary points (yellow card = 1 point, red card as a result of two yellow cards = 3 points, direct red card = 3 points, yellow card followed by direct red card = 4 points);
Drawing of lots.

Group A

Times listed are UTC+6

Group B

Times listed are UTC+6

Knockout stage
Times listed are UTC+6

Bracket

Semi finals

Third place

Final

Winners

Goalscorers

References

External links
Official website

2018
2018 in women's association football
2018 in Asian football
September 2018 sports events in Asia
October 2018 sports events in Asia
2018 in youth association football
International association football competitions hosted by Bhutan
2018 in Bhutanese football